The Pittsburgh Steelers All-Time Team (50th Season) was named as a part of the franchise's 50th season celebration in .  The top 24 players in the club's history were selected: eleven  on offense, eleven on defense, one punter and one placekicker.

The team was chosen on the basis of more than 100,000 fan ballots.

The updated team includes all the players from this 50th season team except, Gerry Mullins, Sam Davis, Mike Wagner, Roy  Gerela and Pat Brady.

Offense

Defense

Specialists

Notes
Names in bold  indicates the player spent his entire playing career with the Steelers.
Number retired by team
Finalist in 2002

References

Pittsburgh Steelers
Philadelphia